Noah (formerly known as Peterpan; and later stylized as NOAH) is an Indonesian rock band formed as Peterpan in Bandung, West Java in 2000, which consisted of six members: Ariel, Andika, Indra, Lukman, Reza and Uki, with Ariel as the leader. Most of their lyrics are written by Ariel, who is the band's lead vocalist. The band currently consists of only three members remaining; Ariel, Lukman, and David.

Starting their career by playing in cafés, Peterpan gained popularity in 2002 after recording "Mimpi yang Sempurna" for a compilation album Kisah 2002 Malam, followed by a debut album Taman Langit in 2003 that was an enormous hit in the country. They gained further popularity in 2004 with their second album Bintang di Surga, which sold over three million copies and won Best of the Best Album in Indonesian Music Awards (AMI) among other awards. A soundtrack album for the film Alexandria released in 2005, also sold over a million copies. Peterpan has won various awards including two MTV Asia Awards for Favorite Artist Indonesia and Best Contribution Award at the 2007 Asia Song Festival. After keyboardist Andika and bassist, Indra split from the band in 2006 keyboardist David joined in 2006, and later became a permanent member after 2 years. Their third and last studio album as Peterpan Hari yang Cerah launched in 2007 continued the band's success. After that, the band agreed to change their name in 2009.

The announcement of a new name was planned in 2010, but it was delayed because vocalist Ariel was arrested that year. After Ariel was released in 2012, the new name, Noah, was announced. Noah regained their popularity in 2012 with their first album, Seperti Seharusnya, which gained huge success by selling more than 1.9 million copies in Indonesia and winning their second AMI Award for Best of the Best Album. Drummer Reza split from the band in 2015, around the same time Noah released their second album, Second Chance, where they collaborated with Steve Lillywhite. Rhythm guitarist Uki also split from the band in 2019 after the release of Keterkaitan Keterikatan album which won another AMI Award for Best of the Best Album.

As of 2015, Noah has sold more than 9 million albums in Indonesia and is recognized as the best selling alternative pop/rock band in the country. They are regarded as one of the most successful bands in the history of Indonesia's popular music. Three of their albums are included on the list of Indonesian all time best selling albums at #3 for Bintang di Surga, #6 for OST Alexandria, and #15 for Seperti Seharusnya.

History

1997–2000: Formation and early years
In 1997, Andika Naliputra Wirahardja, a keyboardist, formed a school band in Bandung, Indonesia that was called Topi, with Abel as bass player, Ari as drummer, and Loekman Hakim who joined the band after being invited by Abel. Lukman later asked his friend, Nazril Irham, to filling the vocals for the band after interested with Ariel's voice. Ariel then proposed Mohammad Kautsar Hikmat as guitarist and Lukman approved it.

Topi started to play in cafés, which they started in the B Club café as their first appearance. Topi also performed at some birthday parties, independence day, and art festivals. Uki, Ariel, and Lukman decided to leave the band after seeing no vision for the band that led Topi to break up. Soon after Topi disbanded, Lukman later joined Bigfabela which consists of several of Topi's men, while Ariel prepared for Ebtanas.

After graduating from high school, Ariel took a break for a year before going to college, a year later. While taking a break, Ariel requested that he join Andika's new band where he was already well known which included Uki and Ari, with the addition of Hendra Suhendra (bass) and Nendy (guitar). The band was later named Universe and appeared in O'Hara café. Lukman later replaced Nendy due to his mismatch with the band and Ilsyah Ryan Reza, Indra's bandmate in Second Act, took Ari's position after unable to follow the band's performance.

2000–2009: Peterpan

2000–2002: Topi's reunion, Kisah 2002 Malam, and Taman Langit
Andika regrouped former members of Topi in 2000, the drummer was replaced by Ilsyah Ryan Reza, a college student from Palu. Loekman Hakim, a friend of Indra's elder brother, joined as their lead guitarist. Andika Naliputra Wirahardja suggested Peterpan as the name for the band referring to Peter Pan, the character created by J. M. Barrie, an author (other names they considered were Spiderman and X-Men). But according to Ariel, the name was taken from the name of a rabbit satay stall at the side road in Puncak, Bogor, that Andika and his mom visited while taking a rest on the trip to Bandung from Jakarta. The band was formally founded on September 1, 2000. Peterpan played on Bandung streets and gigged in cafés, with the goal of becoming a house band in one of the city's cafés. They often covered alternative rock and rock songs, (Nirvana, Pearl Jam, Coldplay, U2, Creed, Lifehouse, The Calling etc.) at O'Hara and Sapu Lidi cafés.

While Peterpan performed as a Caffeine's opening act at Sapu Lidi, Noey, Java Jive's bassist, Caffeine's manager, and producer who planned to release a compilation album that was later known as Kisah 2002 Malam, spotted the band and asked them to fill a Musica Studio's album compilation as a replacement for a band that left the project. Peterpan recorded three demo songs: "Sahabat", "Mimpi yang Sempurna", and "Taman Langit". "Mimpi yang Sempurna" was chosen for the album.  The album was commercially successful, selling a respectable 150,000 copies, and "Mimpi yang Sempurna" was given heavy rotation on Indonesian radio.

Peterpan later toured to several cities like Malang and Makassar as a part of Kisah 2002 Malam's promotion, that made their first appearances outside of Bandung. While on tour, Peterpan covered several bands' songs such as Red Hot Chili Peppers and Radiohead, where their debut single, "Mimpi yang Sempurna", was performed as an encore. On 15 December 2002, Peterpan made their television debut in Trans TV's first anniversary, "Setahun Melangkah Trans TV".

Musica Studio's offered Peterpan a contract and released their debut studio album, Taman Langit, in June 2003. By releasing mega-hits such as "Sahabat", "Mimpi Yang Sempurna" on a piano version, "Aku dan Bintang", "Semua Tentang Kita", "Topeng", and "Yang Terdalam", their debut studio album instantly become hugely popular around the country and made them superstars. The album has sold over 650,000 copies making Peterpan reach a Multi-Platinum Award.

2004–2005: Bintang di Surga and OST Alexandria
Following their debut album's commercial success, Peterpan held concerts in six cities in Indonesia in only 24 hours on July 18, 2004. The six-cities concerts were also part of promotion for their second album. The concerts were titled "Konser Breaking Record" and included concerts on two Indonesian major islands: Sumatra and Java. The concerts started in Medan, then Padang, Pekanbaru, Lampung, Semarang, and finally ended at Surabaya. Peterpan then received an award from Indonesian World Records Museum (MURI) for breaking a record, by being the first band to hold concerts in six provinces in a day.

In 2004, by releasing a number of monster hits such as "Ada Apa Denganmu", "Mungkin Nanti", "Kukatakan Dengan Indah", "Bintang di Surga", "Di Atas Normal", and "Khayalan Tingkat Tinggi", their second studio album Bintang Di Surga was released in August 2004 and quickly became the biggest phenomenon in the 2000s, not only in Indonesia, but also in the neighborhood countries such as Singapore, Brunei, and Malaysia, where in the latter country that album was awarded 6× platinum. Selling over 350,000 copies in two weeks, by the end of 2005, it had sold a remarkable 2.7 million and to date had sold over 3.2 million copies in Indonesia. This album became the third best-selling album of all time in Indonesia and Rolling Stone Indonesia magazine ranked album #116 on "The 150 Greatest Indonesian Albums of All Time" list. A song from this album, "Kukatakan Dengan Indah", got a place at #140 on Rolling Stone Indonesia'''s "150 Greatest Indonesian Songs of All Time" list. Also in 2004, Peterpan collaborated with Indonesian pop singer, Chrisye, in Chrisye's album Senyawa, specifically on the song "Menunggumu" which was written by Ariel.

The greater commercial success of Bintang Di Surga had led Peterpan to receive recognition and won many awards in early 2005, where Peterpan won an award as Indonesia's favorite artist at MTV Asia Aid in Bangkok. At the Indonesian Music Awards (AMI) 2005, Peterpan ranked top in the nominations by obtaining 11 nominations. Four of them were printed through the song "Ada Apa Denganmu". Of the 11 nominations, Peterpan won 7 awards, including "best music group", "best album", "best graphic design album" and "best production work", due to the album Bintang Di Surga. At the SCTV Music Awards 2005, Peterpan was honored in the "Top Pop Group Albums" and "Most Popular Songs". In February 2005, Peterpan planned to release a video album, later titled Untuk Sahabat Peterpan which contains karaoke's music video and the 6 cities on 24 hours' breaking record concert's documentation, the video album was released a month after.

In September 2005, Peterpan released a soundtrack for the Rexinema movie, Alexandria. The album's release concert was aired simultaneously by six national TV stations, live in their hometown, Bandung, at the Dago Plaza. The soundtrack album included five new songs and renditions of five of their songs from Taman Langit and Bintang di Surga. The song "Tak Bisakah" was able to reap the controversy due to being copied by Indian musicians for the film Woh Lamhe Woh Lamhe with the title song "Kya Mujhe Pyaar". This album succeeded, sold over 1.2 million copies and was recognized as the best-selling soundtrack album of all time in Indonesia (#15 on the list of best-selling albums in that country). At the 2006 Anugerah Planet Muzik which is an annual award given to the most popular artists from Indonesia, Singapore, Brunei, and Malaysia Peterpan won two awards as the "Best Duo/Group" for song "Tak Bisakah" and "Most Popular Group Artist". Peterpan also won their second award as Indonesia's favorite artist at MTV Asia Aid.

2006–2009: Andika and Indra departure, Hari yang Cerah, and Sebuah Nama, Sebuah Cerita
In November 2006, Andika and Indra split with the rest of the band, with both sides citing musical differences and lacking contributions from both of them leading to dismissal. According to Ariel, there were problems since the making of their first album. Indra had also just lost his child. Following Andika and Indra's dismissal, Andika's mother was disinclined if the remaining members were still known as Peterpan and Andika set the plan to threaten the band if Peterpan's name didn't retire. Andika and Indra later formed a new band named The Titans, and signed with international label EMI Music Indonesia, releasing a self-titled album and a single, "Rasa Ini".

In 2007, the remaining members of Peterpan released their third studio album, Hari Yang Cerah. This album produced other popular hits like "Menghapus Jejakmu", "Di Balik Awan", "Hari Yang Cerah Untuk Jiwa Yang Sepi", "Sally Sendiri", and "Cobalah Mengerti". The band also held an album's release concert which also aired simultaneously by six national TV stations, also live in Bandung, but at Gasibu this time. In 2018, the single "Menghapus Jejakmu" became the subject of public discussion after there was an element of similarity in the new song released by Korean Boyband iKon "Love Scenario". Although they have similarities, the meanings of the two songs are different.

In September 2007, they took part in the Asia "Song Festival" in South Korea as representatives from Indonesia.

The agreement under which Andika and Indra left the band allowed the remaining members to continue using the name Peterpan through the end of 2008. In early 2008, the band announced that they would be changing their name, stating that their 2008 compilation album, Sebuah Nama Sebuah Cerita, would be their last under the name Peterpan. The album mostly consists of popular hits from the band's history, with four new songs: "Walau Habis Terang", "Kisah Cintaku" (a cover of Chrisye's song), "Dilema Besar", and "Tak Ada Yang Abadi". In the same year, David Kurnia Albert joined Peterpan as a permanent member after replacing Andika as an additional keyboardist a year later.

2009–2012: Unnamed band and instrumental album Suara Lainnya
After retiring the Peterpan name, Ariel, Uki, Lukman, Reza and David continued to play without a band name, using their names as a placeholder. Ariel said that they were planning to announce their new band name in 2010, when they have finished their next album. But this plan was delayed because Ariel was arrested in 2010 for a sex tape scandal.

During Ariel's time in prison, the band worked on an album containing instrumental arrangements of Peterpan songs. Even though the album was instrumental, the vocalist Ariel was still involved by giving the band ideas any time his bandmates visited him in prison. The album, titled Suara Lainnya, was released on 23 May 2012, credited under the name "Ariel, Uki, Lukman, Reza, David". The album's release was supported by a concert, titled "Konser Tanpa Nama", held by Uki, Lukman, Reza and David on 29 May 2012. The instrumental concert was said to be the first of its kind in Indonesia.

2012–present: Noah
2012–2013: Renaming as Noah, Seperti Seharusnya and resurgence of popularity

After Ariel was released early on July 23, 2012, Ariel, Uki, Lukman, Reza and David announced their new name, Noah, on August 2, 2012. According to the band, they were not specifically referencing the prophet Noah. Ariel stated that he simply thought the name was simple and fit with their music. Then on August 3, 2012, the band released their first single under then Noah name, "Separuh Aku", via simultaneous airplay on 200 radios at 15.08 WIB, refers to release date. On August 9, 2012, Noah released a book titled Kisah Lainnya.

On 15–16 September 2012, Noah held a concert in five countries in 24-hour span in Melbourne, Hong Kong, Kuala Lumpur, Singapore, and Jakarta. With this concert, Noah broke another Indonesian World Records Museum (MURI) record, after previously breaking a MURI record in 2004. Their first album under the Noah name, Seperti Seharusnya, was released on the same day. The album was sold through KFC outlets and has sold over 200 thousand copies in three days since its release. By February 2013, the album has sold over one million copies and Noah received a Multi-Platinum Award. With over a million sales, Seperti Seharusnya was one of the best-selling albums in Indonesia.

By the commercial success of their album Seperti Seharusnya, Noah won many awards. In the 2013 Indonesian Music Award (AMI), Noah ranked top in the nominations by obtaining 10 nominations. Four of them were printed through the song "Separuh Aku". Of the 10 nominations, Noah won 6 awards, including "Best Pop Duo/Group", "Best Pop/Urban Recording Producer", "Best of the Best Production Work" for the single Separuh Aku, and "Best Pop/Urban Album", "Best of the Best Album" for album Seperti Seharusnya. At the Anugerah Planet Muzik which is an annual award given to the most popular artists from Indonesia, Singapore, and Malaysia. Noah won the award "Best Band" twice in the second consecutive year (2013 and 2014) for both songs "Separuh Aku" and "Tak Lagi Sama", and "APM Most Popular Artist" in 2014. Noah also won The Nickelodeon Indonesia Kids' Choice Awards in 2013 as "Favorite Band".

2014–2016: Second Chance, Reza departure, Sings Legends

In June 2014, Noah announced that they were making new songs and a new album and that they were working with an English producer, Steve Lillywhite, to produce them. The collaboration resulted in Noah's first English-language song, "Hero", which was released as a single via airplay in 170 radios on August 6, 2014, and in iTunes on August 7, 2014.

In December 2014, Reza announced that he was going to leave the band after one last show on New Year's Eve. By January 1, 2015, Reza was officially no longer part of the band. Also on December 31, Noah released their new album, Second Chance, which contains three new songs including "Hero" and nine rearrangements of Peterpan's song.

In March 2015, Noah announced that they were planning to hold a tour in United States in April 2015, specifically in four cities: San Francisco, Los Angeles, New York, and Washington DC. The tour was delayed because Ariel was not fit among other unstated reasons. The tour ended up being held in October 2015 in three cities: Los Angeles, Washington DC, and New York.

On May 19, 2016, Noah released an album titled Sings Legends. The album consists of rearrangements of eight Indonesian songs that Noah considered legendary.

2017–2020: Keterkaitan Keterikatan and Uki departure
After releasing and promoting Sings Legends, Noah began working on a new album, the first since Seperti Seharusnya that fully consisted of new songs. At first, the album was planned to be released in 2017. On September 16, 2017, Noah released two songs, "Jalani Mimpi" and "My Situation", as a single. On the night of the same day, Noah held a concert titled Road to New Album, where they played those two songs. They also told the audience that they had only finished those two songs and were not close to finishing the album yet. In July 2018, Ariel said that they had almost finished the music for the album's songs, but the lyrics were not halfway done. Because the process was taking longer than usual, Noah got help from Java Jive guitarist, Capung, who previously had produced Peterpan's album. Noah also collaborated with other singers and writers to write the lyrics.

On June 14, 2019, Noah released "Wanitaku", a song that they had partially revealed in 2017, as a JOOX-exclusive single. Then on June 28, "Wanitaku" was released on other digital music services. Audio video for "Wanitaku" that Noah uploaded to YouTube revealed the album title, Keterkaitan Keterikatan, as well as its cover. On August 8, 2019, Noah held an album-launching concert for Keterkaitan Keterikatan. On the same day, Noah's guitarist Uki announced his resignation from the band via an Instagram post.

At a press conference on 14 August 2019, Noah announced the compact disk release of Keterkaitan Keterikatan via KFC restaurant chain. The album was subsequently released in digital music services on 28 August 2019. As of 12 September 2019, the physical format has sold over 400,000 copies and received 4× Platinum certification from Musica Studio's. At the 23rd Anugerah Musik Indonesia, the album won another Best of the Best Album award for Noah.

2021–present: Continuation of Second Chance
On 12 December 2021, Noah announced that they will release Second Chance: Taman Langit, a re-recording of their 2003 album Taman Langit, and perform in a series of concerts in 2022. Noah's version of Taman Langit, along with a remake of "Yang Terdalam" music video, was released on 17 December 2021. Noah then continued by releasing a re-recorded version of "Bintang di Surga" as a single on 7 January 2022. Noah's version of their 2004 album Bintang di Surga was released afterwards on 12 January 2022. Lastly, Noah released the new version of "Menghapus Jejakmu" as a single with a music video on 21 January 2022, and the new version of Hari yang Cerah'' on 26 January 2022.

Community
Now, NOAH's fanbase has expanded up to 60 communities in Indonesia, and also including Malaysia, Singapore, Hongkong and Taiwan, mainly known as 'Sahabat NOAH'.

Case and controversy

Riots at concerts
Like many other popular musicians in Indonesia, Noah's concerts have experienced problems. On February 22, 2006, at Harapan Bangsa Lhongraya Stadium, at least 30 spectators fainted, most being young women. The concert was also said to have violated Shariah law in Aceh because of the mixing of male and female spectators in the show field.

The riots at concerts not only affected the spectators but also members of the group performing. An example of this occurred on April 11, 2006, during a Peterpan concert in Bima Stadium, Cirebon, when rocks were thrown by the spectators who had no tickets outside of the stadium. This event caused harm to dozens of the spectators inside the stadium which prompted many of them to rush to various hospitals due to being hit by the falling stones, as well as the vocalist, Ariel, who was struck in the chest before he was secured to the outside of the stadium. As a result of the incident, the concert was stopped when the band was performing their fifth song of the night, "Mungkin Nanti", at around 20:30 WIB.

Sex tape scandal
In 2010, Ariel was arrested for violating Indonesian anti-pornography laws, when videos which appeared to be himself having sexual intercourse circulated on the internet, after his laptop was reportedly stolen.

In January 2011, Bandung's District Court sentenced Ariel to three and a half years imprisonment after testimonies by digital forensic experts confirmed that Ariel was the male counterpart in the sex tape scandal, involving Luna Maya and Cut Tari, and that he was responsible for the creation of the videos. In April, an appeal to the High Court was rejected, with judges deciding unanimously to uphold the sentence given by the District Court.
On 23 July 2012, after serving two years in prison, Ariel was released early for good behavior.

Band members

Current members
 Nazril "Ariel" Irham – vocals, rhythm guitar, tambourine, piano (2000–present)
 Loekman Hakim – lead guitar, backing vocals (2000–present)
 David Kurnia Albert – keyboards, piano, synthesizer, backing vocals (2006–present)

Additional members
 Rio Alief – drums, percussion (2015–present)
 Muhammad Dwi Maulana – bass guitar (2015–present), backing vocals (2017–present)
 Iqbal Maruli - drums (2016–present), percussion (2020-present)
 Iwan Sukma – rhythm and lead guitar, backing vocals (2019–present)

Former members
 Andika Naliputra Wirahardja – keyboards, piano, backing vocals (2000–2006)
 Hendra "Indra" Suhendra – bass guitar, backing vocals (2000–2006)
 Ilsyah Ryan Reza – drums (2000–2015)
 Mohammad Kautsar "Uki" Hikmat – rhythm and lead guitar, backing vocals (2000–2019)

Former additional members
 Yosafat Luki Marendra – bass guitar (2006–2009)
 Ihsan Nurrahman – bass guitar, backing vocals (2009–2013)
 Boyi Tondo – bass guitar, backing vocals (2013–2015)

Timeline

Discography

Albums

Studio albums

Soundtrack albums

Re-recorded albums

Compilation albums

Collaboration albums

Singles

As lead artist

As featured artist

Promotional singles

Music videos

Filmography

Film

Awards and recognition

See also

 List of Indonesian rock bands
 List of alternative-rock artists
 List of best selling albums of all time in Indonesia

Notes

References

External links

Official site
Peterpan discography at Discogs
Noah discography at Discogs

 
Pop rock groups
Indonesian alternative rock groups
Indonesian pop music groups
Anugerah Musik Indonesia winners
Musical groups established in 2000
Musical groups from Bandung